Dacalana kurosawai is a butterfly of the family Lycaenidae.  It is endemic to the Philippines and found in Palawan and Calamian islands.

References

 , 1976: New Subspecies of Lycaenid from Palawan. Tyô to Ga. 27(1): 19-24.
 , 1999: Zur Kenntnis Philippinischer Lycaenidae, 11. Entomologische Zeitschrift . 109(4): 152-154.
 , 2012: Revised checklist of the butterflies of the Philippine Islands (Lepidoptera: Rhopalocera). Nachrichten des Entomologischen Vereins Apollo, Suppl. 20: 1-64.

Dacalana
Lepidoptera of the Philippines
Butterflies described in 1976